Bridge in Lewis Township was an historic Pratt through truss bridge spanning Lycoming Creek at Lewis Township, Lycoming County, Pennsylvania.  It was built in 1890, and measures 171 feet long and 18 feet wide.

It was added to the National Register of Historic Places in 1988. The bridge was documented for the Historic American Engineering Record in 1990 prior to removal and replacement of the bridge.

References

External links 
 

Road bridges on the National Register of Historic Places in Pennsylvania
Bridges completed in 1890
Bridges in Lycoming County, Pennsylvania
1890 establishments in Pennsylvania
Historic American Engineering Record in Pennsylvania
National Register of Historic Places in Lycoming County, Pennsylvania
Pratt truss bridges in the United States
Metal bridges in the United States